The siege of Fort St Philip, also known as the siege of Minorca, took place from 20 April to 29 June 1756 during the Seven Years' War. Ceded to Great Britain in 1714 by Spain following the War of the Spanish Succession, its capture by France threatened the British naval position in the Western Mediterranean and it was returned after the Treaty of Paris (1763).

Background
The Spanish island of Menorca was captured by the British in 1708 during the War of the Spanish Succession and along with Gibraltar ceded to Great Britain under the 1714 Treaty of Utrecht. Although considered vital for control of the Western Mediterranean, it was also extremely vulnerable, since the Spanish deeply resented British occupation, while it was only two days sail from Cádiz, and one from the French naval base at Toulon. Attempts by William Blakeney, Lieutenant governor of Menorca and commander of the garrison of Fort St Philip, to reduce local opposition by encouraging his troops to marry local women, and controlling Catholic schools and institutions proved unsuccessful. 

A Parliamentary committee later set up to investigate the island's loss noted the poor state of its defences, with crumbling walls and rotten gun platforms, while over 35 senior officers were absent from their posts, including the governor of Fort St Philip, and the colonels of all four regiments in its garrison. In addition, while Blakeney had a long and distinguished military career, by 1756 he was over 80 years old and suffering from Alcoholism.

Aware of the island's vulnerability, the French hoped its capture would provide them with a bargaining chip to persuade Ferdinand VI of Spain to join the war as their ally. In the event this proved not to be the case, as Ferdinand remained neutral until his death in 1759. Although the Seven Years' War did not formally begin until France declared war on Britain on 9 June 1756, at the beginning of the year Jean-Baptiste de Machault d'Arnouville, then head of the French naval ministry, ordered the Duke de Richelieu to prepare an expeditionary force to take the island.

Siege 

Richelieu sailed from Marseille on 10 April with transports carrying 16,000 troops and escorted by seventeen naval vessels; he reached Menorca on 18 April, occupied most of the island and then on 8 May began to bombard St. Philip's Castle. Informed of Richelieu's preparations in mid March, Blakeney had substantially strengthened his fortifications but the presence of numerous non-combatants, including over 800 women and children, meant the garrison would quickly run short of supplies.  

A squadron of the Royal Navy from Gibraltar under Admiral John Byng attempted to relieve the fort but withdrew after the largely indecisive Battle of Minorca on 20 May. Although the engagement has been described as a "minor cannonade", his retreat effectively sealed the fate of the garrison, and Blakeney surrendered on 29 June, two days after the besiegers captured several important outworks. 

During the siege, the British garrison lost 59 killed and 149 wounded, French casualties amounting to some 1,600 dead and 2,000 wounded. Since Blakeney surrendered on terms, the surviving members of the garrison along with British civilians from the local administration, a total of 4,378 in all, were transported to Gibraltar in French ships, arriving there on 11 July. In the inquiry that followed, Byng was condemned of failing "to do his utmost" and executed in March 1757 despite pleas for leniency, prompting French author Voltaire to later write that the English "shoot an admiral from time to time, to encourage the others". Thomas Fowke, Governor of Gibraltar, previously court-martialled but acquitted for his role in the 1746 defeat at Prestonpans, was also found guilty of not sending reinforcements early enough and dismissed. 

In contrast, the popular press portrayed Blakeney as a hero, the heavy drinking that left him with "a paralytick disorder" and "nervous tremors" being portrayed as the virtues of a simple soldier. His professional colleagues were far more critical; William Cunninghame, his chief engineer and deputy, strongly objected to the surrender, which he considered premature, and listed numerous deficiencies in the conduct of the defence.

Aftermath

Hyacinthe Gaëtan de Lannion was appointed the first French Governor of Menorca. A British naval squadron led by Sir Edward Hawke sent out to replace Byng, arrived off Menorca shortly after the surrender. As Hawke did not have enough troops on board to land and mount a siege to retake the island he departed, cruising in the waters off Marseilles for three months before sailing home. He was later criticised for failing to mount a blockade of the island, which might have forced it to surrender through starvation.

The French held Menorca until the Treaty of Paris (1763), when Britain exchanged it for the island of Guadeloupe. The Spanish recaptured Menorca in 1781 during the 1779 to 1783 Anglo-Spanish War and it was formally returned to them by Britain in the Treaty of Paris (1783).

Order of battle

British Army 
Land forces which formed part of the garrison included:

 4th (The King's Own) Regiment of Foot
 7th Regiment of Foot (Royal Fusiliers)
 23rd Regiment of Foot (Royal Welch Fusiliers)
 24th Regiment of Foot
 34th Regiment of Foot

French Army 
The French invasion force consisted of: 

 1er Bataillon du Régiment de Cambis (2nd Btn later joined, originally garrisoned in Monaco)
 1er & 2e Bataillons du Régiment de Vermandois
 1er & 2e Bataillons du Régiment de Rohan Rochefort
 1er & 2e Bataillons du Régiment de Médoc
 1er & 2e Bataillons du Régiment Royal
 1er & 2e Bataillons du Régiment de Bretagne
 1er & 2e Bataillons du Régiment de Haynault
 1er & 2e Bataillons du Régiment de Talaru
 1er & 2e Bataillons du Régiment de Briqueville
 1er & 2e Bataillons du Régiment de La Marine
 1er Bataillon du Régiment de La Marche
 1er Bataillon du Régiment de Briqueville
 1er Bataillon du Régiment de Royal Italien
 1er Bataillon du Régiment de Soissonnais
 1er Bataillon du Royal–Artillerie (Chabrié)
 x1 Compagnie du Miners
 x1 Compagnie du Workers

Arriving later as reinforcements:

 1er & 2e Bataillons du Régiment de Traisnel (arriving on 15 May)
 1er & 2e Bataillons du Régiment de Nice (arriving on 21 May)

Notes

References

Sources

Bibliography
 Anderson, Fred. Crucible of War: The Seven Years' War and the Fate of Empire in British North America, 1754-1766. Faber and Faber, 2000.
 Browning, Reed. The Duke of Newcastle. Yale University Press, 1975.
 Longmate, Norman. Island Fortress: The Defence of Great Britain, 1603-1945. Harper Collins, 1993
 McLynn, Frank. 1759: The Year Britain Became Master of the World. Pimlico, 2005.
 Rodger NAM. Command of the Ocean: A Naval History of Britain, 1649-1815. Penguin Books, 2006. 
 Simms, Brendan. Three Victories and a Defeat: The Rise and Fall of the First British Empire. Penguin Books, 2008.

Seven Years' War
Fort St. Philip (1756)
Fort St. Philip 1756
History of Menorca
Fort St. Philip (1756)
Conflicts in 1756
1756 in Europe